Medburn may refer to:
Peter de Medburn (fl. 1294),  English medieval jurist and university chancellor
Medburn, Northumberland, village in Ponteland civil parish, England